Dr. Numal Momin (born 25 February 1972) is an Indian politician serving as the Deputy Speaker of the Assam Legislative Assembly since 2021.He represents the Bokajan constituency in the Assam Legislative Assembly since 2016.Dr. Numal Momin, is a doctor by profession. He is a member of Bharatiya Janata Party and serving as a spokesperson of the BJP Assam State unit. Momin is also the chairperson of Assam Urban Water Supply and Sewerage Board. Belonging to the Garo community, he contested for the Member of Assam Legislative Assembly, becoming the first  Garo in the state, to ever win an election.

Background 
Momin belongs to Garo tribe. He completed his schooling from Balipathar High School in Bokajan in 1989. He has done his graduation (MBBS) from Gauhati Medical College in Guwahati in 1999. Momin was an Assistant Professor of Gauhati Medical College. He was also an MD (Medicine) in Assam Medical College in 2006. He is married to Anupama Hajong.

Political career 
Momin started his political career in 2016 by contesting as a candidate by Bharatiya Janata Party for 17 no Bokajan Legislative Assembly Constituency. He defeated his strongest rival and sitting MLA of Indian National Congress Mr. Klengdong with a margin of 4,717 votes. He has been chosen as one of the BJP spokespersons for the state unit. Dr Momin has been appointed Chairperson of Assam Urban Water Supply and Sewerage Board and given a rank of Minister of State by Government of Assam.

References

External links 
 https://twitter.com/DrNumal

Living people
Bharatiya Janata Party politicians from Assam
Assam MLAs 2016–2021
People from Karbi Anglong district
1972 births
Assam MLAs 2021–2026
Deputy Speakers of the Assam Legislative Assembly
Garo people